This article lists events from the year 2022 in Malawi.

Incumbents 

 President: Lazarus Chakwera
 Vice-President: Saulos Chilima

Events 
Ongoing – COVID-19 pandemic in Malawi

 24 March – The World Health Organization announces that a polio vaccination campaign will begin in Malawi, Mozambique, Tanzania, and Zambia.
 29 April – A high court in Malawi convicts five people of killing an albino man and seven more people of selling the man's body parts. The body parts are desired by some local residents, who believe that they can bring luck and wealth.

Deaths 

 29 July – Emmie Chanika, human rights activist (born 1956)

See also 

 COVID-19 pandemic in Africa

References

External links 

 
2020s in Malawi
Years of the 21st century in Malawi
Malawi
Malawi